Badakhshani or Badakhshi' may refer to:

 Badakhshan, the historic region situated in northeastern Afghanistan and eastern Tajikistan
 Badakhshan Province, a province in Afghanistan
 Gorno-Badakhshan Autonomous Province, an autonomous region in Tajikistan
 Lali Badakhshan, a political party in Tajikistan
 Music of Badakhshan
 Mullah Shah Badakhshi, a Sufi spiritual leader
 Pamiri people, a population from Gorno-Badakhshan, Tajikistan also called Badakhshanis

See also 
 Badakhshan (disambiguation)